The Home Minister of Bangladesh is the minister in charge of the Ministry of Home Affairs of the Government of the People's Republic of Bangladesh. He is also the minister of all departments and agencies under the Ministry of Home Affairs.

Abul Hasnat Muhammad Qamaruzzaman was the first person appointed to this office by the then Mujibnagar government formed during the Bangladesh War of Independence in 1971.

List of ministers, advisers and state ministers

References

Government ministers of Bangladesh
 
Government of Bangladesh
Lists of ministers by ministry of Bangladesh